Leo Anthony Maynes (5 June 1911 – 4 August 1998) was an Australian rules footballer who played with Fitzroy and Essendon in the Victorian Football League (VFL).

From 1942 to 1945 he served in the Australian Army during World War II, including stints in Borneo and New Guinea.

Notes

External links 

1911 births
1998 deaths
Australian rules footballers from Melbourne
Fitzroy Football Club players
Essendon Football Club players
Brunswick Football Club players